The Nashoba Brook Pencil Factory Site contains the ruins of a 19th-century dam-powered pencil factory. This factory was one of several in Acton and Concord, Massachusetts at the time that brought important developments to pencil manufacturing. All that remain today of the factory are the ruins of its dam and a few mechanical components. The site is in the Nashoba Brook Conservation Area in Acton, Massachusetts, along Nashoba Brook and the old Davis Road Dam. Visitors can access the site by following a marked path from the Davis Road parking area for the Nashoba Brook Conservation Area

19th century Concord-based pencil industry 

The American pencil industry started in Concord in the 19th century. In 1812, William Munroe, a Concord-based cabinet maker, became the first American to successfully manufacture and sell wood-encased pencils. Munroe's main competitor later became the Thoreau family pencil business in Concord, run by John Thoreau, father of Henry David Thoreau. John Thoreau's brother-in-law, Charles Dunbar, discovered a deposit of graphite in Bristol, New Hampshire, in 1821. In 1823, Dunbar asked John Thoreau to join him in manufacturing pencils from this graphite. Later, Dunbar left the firm, and it acquired the name John Thoreau & Company. Henry David Thoreau worked at his family's factory for most of his adult life.

Ebenezer Wood 

The founder of the factory at this site was Ebenezer Wood (1792–1880). Wood brought several innovations to pencil manufacturing, such as the use of the circular saw and octagonal and hexagonal forms for wood pencil casings. The hexagonal form has since become common for pencils.

Ebenezer Wood was, like Munroe, a cabinet maker. It was perhaps this commonality that brought them together when Munroe hired Wood to help operate his two-man saw for cutting the pencil casings. Eventually, Wood brought additional machinery and automation into Munroe's factory.

Wood then started his own mill for grounding plumbago for the graphite used in pencils. Initially, Munroe was one of his customers. However, by the 1830s, he sold plumbago exclusively to the Thoreau company, a business relation that lasted many years. Henry David Thoreau supposedly purchased his sketch pencils from Wood's factory.

Nashoba Brook mills 

This factory was one of several mills that once drew power from Nashoba Brook. The factory was situated on the western edge of the stream closer to the Framingham & Lowell Railroad tracks. The site is currently inaccessible from the Pencil Factory Kiosk and the Nashoba Brook Conservation Area trails. The kiosk does contain a picture of the site circa 1900. The site can be viewed from the newly opened section of the Bruce Freeman Rail Trail. An historical marker and photograph alongside the trail explain the significance of the site, and the contribution of Ebeneezer Wood. 

Paths that run on either side of Nashoba Brook connect the upstream sites to the Pencil Mill.

Another pencil factory was located downstream at Brook Street.

Trail Through Time 

The Pencil Factory is due to be part of Acton's Trail Through Time, which is being developed to document the settlement and use of North Acton's Nashoba Brook. Besides the Factory site, other points on the trail will include the Potato Cave and the Wheeler Farm site at the end of Wheeler Lane.

Timeline

See also 

 Henry David Thoreau
 Pencil
 History of Acton, Massachusetts

References

External links 
 Nashoba Brook Pencil Factory Kiosk (Link defunct as of 25 January 2019)
 Nashoba Brook Pencil Factory Kiosk Acton Historical Society

Archaeological sites in Massachusetts
Pencil brands
Buildings and structures in Middlesex County, Massachusetts